Oleksandr Sokorenko (born 23 February 1976 in Kharkiv, Ukrainian SSR, Soviet Union, now Ukraine) is a Ukrainian football coach and a former goalkeeper. He works as an assistant manager with FC SKChF Sevastopol.

External links
 Stats on PFC Sevstopol club's Site (Rus)
 Profile at Official FFU Site (Ukr)

1976 births
Living people
Ukrainian footballers
FC Sevastopol players
SC Tavriya Simferopol players
FC Krymteplytsia Molodizhne players
FC Tytan Armyansk players
Association football goalkeepers
Footballers from Kharkiv